Grewia bicolor, called bastard brandy bush, false brandy bush, two-coloured grewia, white-leaved grewia, white-leaved raisin, white raisin and donkey berry (a name it shares with Grewia flavescens), is a species of flowering plant in the family Malvaceae, native to SubSaharan Africa, Yemen, Oman, and the Indian Subcontinent. In Africa Grewia bicolor is one of the most important forages during the dry season, when all herbivores, wild and domestic, find it palatable. It is particularly enjoyed by giant eland (Taurotragus derbianus) and domestic goats (Capra aegagrus hircus).

References

bicolor
Forages
Flora of West Tropical Africa
Flora of West-Central Tropical Africa
Flora of Northeast Tropical Africa
Flora of East Tropical Africa
Flora of South Tropical Africa
Flora of Southern Africa
Flora of Oman
Flora of Yemen
Flora of India (region)
Flora of Nepal
Flora of Pakistan
Plants described in 1804